Hla Myint, better known by his pseudonym Nat Nwe, was a prominent Burmese writer, best known as the founder of Nwe Ni, a foreign affairs magazine. He began his career in 1950, after publishing a poem titled "Schoolgirl" in the Hanthawaddy newspaper. Over the course of his career, he wrote more than 100 novels and translated 20 from other languages into Burmese. He died of natural causes at his home on 11 May 2011 and was cremated at Yayway Cemetery on 13 May.

References

Burmese writers
Burmese male poets
People from Myitkyina
1933 births
2011 deaths
20th-century Burmese poets
20th-century male writers